Pregeometry, and in full combinatorial pregeometry, are essentially synonyms for "matroid". They were introduced by Gian-Carlo Rota with the intention of providing a less "ineffably cacophonous" alternative term.  Also, the term combinatorial geometry, sometimes abbreviated to geometry, was intended to replace "simple matroid".  These terms are now infrequently used in the study of matroids.

It turns out that many fundamental concepts of linear algebra – closure, independence, subspace, basis, dimension – are available in the general framework of pregeometries.

In the branch of mathematical logic called model theory, infinite finitary matroids, there called "pregeometries" (and "geometries" if they are simple matroids), are used in the discussion of independence phenomena. The study of how pregeometries, geometries, and abstract closure operators influence the structure of first-order models is called geometric stability theory.

Motivation 
The Steinitz exchange lemma is equivalent to the statement: if , then 

The linear algebra concepts of independent set, generating set, basis and dimension can all be expressed using the -operator alone. Then we can define the "linear algebra" concepts also in this more general setting. 

This generalized notion of dimension is very useful in model theory, where in certain situation one can argue as follows: two models with the same cardinality must have the same dimension and two models with the same dimension must be isomorphic.

Definitions

Pregeometries and geometries 
For all  and :

  is monotone increasing and dominates  (i.e.  implies ) and is idempotent (i.e. )
 Exchange principle: If , then  (and hence by monotonicity and idempotence in fact ).
It is then clear that finite intersections of closed sets are closed and that  is the smallest closed set containing .

A geometry is a pregeometry in which the closure of singletons are singletons and the closure of the empty set is the empty set.

Independence, bases and dimension 

Given sets ,  is independent over  if  for any . We say that  is independent if it is independent over the empty set.

A basis is the same as a maximal independent subset, and using Zorn's lemma one can show that every set has a basis.

Note that this relation is symmetric.

Automorphisms and homogeneous pregeometries 

An automorphism of a pregeometry  is a bijection  such that  for any .

The associated geometry and localizations 

Given a pregeometry  its associated geometry (sometimes referred in the literature as the canonical geometry) is the geometry  where

, and
For any , 

Its easy to see that the associated geometry of a homogeneous pregeometry is homogeneous.

Types of pregeometries 

The pregeometry  is said to be:

 trivial (or degenerate) if  for all non-empty .
 locally modular if it has a localization at a singleton which is modular.
 (locally) projective if it is non-trivial and (locally) modular.
 locally finite if closures of finite sets are finite.

Triviality, modularity and local modularity pass to the associated geometry and are preserved under localization.

Examples

The trivial example 

If  is any set we may define  for all . This pregeometry is a trivial, homogeneous, locally finite geometry.

Vector spaces and projective spaces 

Then  is a pregeometry where closures of sets are defined to be their span.

This pregeometry is homogeneous and modular. Vector spaces are considered to be the prototypical example of modularity.

 is locally finite if and only if  is finite.

 is not a geometry, as the closure of any nontrivial vector is a subspace of size at least .

It is easy to see that this pregeometry is a projective geometry.

Affine spaces 

Let  be a -dimensional affine space over a field . Given a set define its closure to be its affine hull (i.e. the smallest affine subspace containing it).

This forms a homogeneous -dimensional geometry.

However, it is easy to check that all localizations are modular.

Field extensions and transcendence degree 

Let  be a field extension. The dimension of  coincides with the transcendence degree .

In model theory, the case of  being algebraically closed and  its prime field is especially important.

While vector spaces are modular and affine spaces are "almost" modular (i.e. everywhere locally modular), algebraically closed fields are examples of the other extremity, not being even locally modular (i.e. none of the localizations is modular).

Strongly minimal sets in model theory 
Given a countable first-order language L and an L-structure M, any definable subset D of M that is strongly minimal gives rise to a pregeometry on the set D. The closure operator here is given by the algebraic closure in the model-theoretic sense.

A model of a strongly minimal theory is determined up to isomorphism by its dimension as a pregeometry; this fact is used in the proof of Morley's categoricity theorem.

In minimal sets over stable theories the independence relation coincides with the notion of forking independence.

References

 H.H. Crapo and G.-C. Rota (1970),  On the Foundations of Combinatorial Theory: Combinatorial Geometries.  M.I.T. Press, Cambridge, Mass.
 Pillay, Anand (1996),  Geometric Stability Theory. Oxford Logic Guides.  Oxford University Press.
 

Matroid theory

Model theory